Lambda calculus (also written as λ-calculus) is a formal system in mathematical logic for expressing computation based on function abstraction and application using variable binding and substitution. It is a universal model of computation that can be used to simulate any Turing machine. It was introduced by the mathematician Alonzo Church in the 1930s as part of his research into the foundations of mathematics.

Lambda calculus consists of constructing lambda terms and performing reduction operations on them. In the simplest form of lambda calculus, terms are built using only the following rules:

  – variable, a character or string representing a parameter or mathematical/logical value.
  – abstraction, function definition ( is a lambda term). The variable  becomes bound in the expression.
  – application, applying a function  to an argument .

The reduction operations include:

  – α-conversion, renaming the bound variables in the expression. Used to avoid name collisions.
  – β-reduction, replacing the bound variables with the argument expression in the body of the abstraction.

If De Bruijn indexing is used, then α-conversion is no longer required as there will be no name collisions. If repeated application of the reduction steps eventually terminates, then by the Church–Rosser theorem it will produce a β-normal form.

Variable names are not needed if using a universal lambda function, such as Iota and Jot, which can create any function behavior by calling it on itself in various combinations.

 Explanation and applications 
Lambda calculus is Turing complete, that is, it is a universal model of computation that can be used to simulate any Turing machine. Its namesake, the Greek letter lambda (λ), is used in lambda expressions and lambda terms to denote binding a variable in a function.

Lambda calculus may be untyped or typed. In typed lambda calculus, functions can be applied only if they are capable of accepting the given input's "type" of data. Typed lambda calculi are weaker than the untyped lambda calculus, which is the primary subject of this article, in the sense that typed lambda calculi can express less than the untyped calculus can. On the other hand, typed lambda calculi allow more things to be proven. For example, in the simply typed lambda calculus it is a theorem that every evaluation strategy terminates for every simply typed lambda-term, whereas evaluation of untyped lambda-terms need not terminate. One reason there are many different typed lambda calculi has been the desire to do more (of what the untyped calculus can do) without giving up on being able to prove strong theorems about the calculus.

Lambda calculus has applications in many different areas in mathematics, philosophy, linguistics, and computer science. Lambda calculus has played an important role in the development of the theory of programming languages. Functional programming languages implement lambda calculus. Lambda calculus is also a current research topic in category theory.

 History 
The lambda calculus was introduced by mathematician Alonzo Church in the 1930s as part of an investigation into the foundations of mathematics. The original system was shown to be logically inconsistent in 1935 when Stephen Kleene and J. B. Rosser developed the Kleene–Rosser paradox.

Subsequently, in 1936 Church isolated and published just the portion relevant to computation, what is now called the untyped lambda calculus. In 1940, he also introduced a computationally weaker, but logically consistent system, known as the simply typed lambda calculus.

Until the 1960s when its relation to programming languages was clarified, the lambda calculus was only a formalism. Thanks to Richard Montague and other linguists' applications in the semantics of natural language, the lambda calculus has begun to enjoy a respectable place in both linguistics and computer science.

 Origin of the lambda symbol 
There is some uncertainty over the reason for Church's use of the Greek letter lambda (λ) as the notation for function-abstraction in the lambda calculus, perhaps in part due to conflicting explanations by Church himself. According to Cardone and Hindley (2006):
By the way, why did Church choose the notation “λ”? In [an unpublished 1964 letter to Harald Dickson] he stated clearly that it came from the notation “” used for class-abstraction by Whitehead and Russell, by first modifying “” to “” to distinguish function-abstraction from class-abstraction, and then changing “” to “λ” for ease of printing.

This origin was also reported in [Rosser, 1984, p.338]. On the other hand, in his later years Church told two enquirers that the choice was more accidental: a symbol was needed and λ just happened to be chosen.
Dana Scott has also addressed this question in various public lectures.
Scott recounts that he once posed a question about the origin of the lambda symbol to Church's former student and son-in-law John W. Addison Jr., who then wrote his father-in-law a postcard:
Dear Professor Church,

Russell had the iota operator, Hilbert had the epsilon operator. Why did you choose lambda for your operator?
According to Scott, Church's entire response consisted of returning the postcard with the following annotation: "eeny, meeny, miny, moe".

 Informal description 

 Motivation 
Computable functions are a fundamental concept within computer science and mathematics. The lambda calculus provides simple semantics for computation which are useful for formally studying properties of computation. The lambda calculus incorporates two simplifications that make its semantics simple.
The first simplification is that the lambda calculus treats functions "anonymously;" it does not give them explicit names. For example, the function
 
can be rewritten in anonymous form as
 
Similarly, the function
 
can be rewritten in anonymous form as
 
where the input is simply mapped to itself.

The second simplification is that the lambda calculus only uses functions of a single input. An ordinary function that requires two inputs, for instance the  function, can be reworked into an equivalent function that accepts a single input, and as output returns another function, that in turn accepts a single input. For example,
 
can be reworked into
 
This method, known as currying, transforms a function that takes multiple arguments into a chain of functions each with a single argument.

Function application of the  function to the arguments (5, 2), yields at once
 
 
 ,
whereas evaluation of the curried version requires one more step
 
This is like β-reduction.
Again, similar to β-reduction.
 
to arrive at the same result.

 The lambda calculus 
The lambda calculus consists of a language of lambda terms''', that are defined by a certain formal syntax, and a set of transformation rules for manipulating the lambda terms. These transformation rules can be viewed as an equational theory or as an operational definition.

As described above, having no names, all functions in the lambda calculus are anonymous functions. They only accept one input variable, so currying is used to implement functions of several variables.

 Lambda terms 
The syntax of the lambda calculus defines some expressions as valid lambda calculus expressions and some as invalid, just as some strings of characters are valid C programs and some are not. A valid lambda calculus expression is called a "lambda term".

The following three rules give an inductive definition that can be applied to build all syntactically valid lambda terms:{{efn|name=lamTerms|1= The expression e can be:   variables x, lambda abstractions, or applications —in BNF,  .— from Wikipedia's Simply typed lambda calculus#Syntax for untyped lambda calculus }}
 variable  is itself a valid lambda term.
Nothing else is a lambda term. Thus a lambda term is valid if and only if it can be obtained by repeated application of these three rules. However, some parentheses can be omitted according to certain rules. For example, the outermost parentheses are usually not written. See §Notation, below for when to include parentheses

 An abstraction  denotes an § anonymous function that takes a single input  and returns . The name  is superfluous when using abstraction. 
 binds the variable  in the term . The definition of a function with an abstraction merely "sets up" the function but does not invoke it. See §Notation below for usage of parentheses

 An application    represents the application of a function  to an input , that is, it represents the act of calling function  on input  to produce .

There is no concept in lambda calculus of variable declaration. The abstraction  is syntactically valid, and represents a function that adds its input to the yet-unknown .

Parentheses may be used and may be needed to disambiguate terms. For example, 
 which is of form  —an abstraction, and 
 which is of form  —an application. The examples 1 and 2 denote different terms; however example 1 is a function definition, while example 2 is an application.

 Functions that operate on functions 
In lambda calculus, functions are taken to be 'first class values', so functions may be used as the inputs, or be returned as outputs from other functions.

Further,  represents the constant function , the function that always returns , no matter the input. In lambda calculus, function application is regarded as left-associative, so that  means .

There are several notions of "equivalence" and "reduction" that allow lambda terms to be "reduced" to "equivalent" lambda terms.

 Alpha equivalence 
A basic form of equivalence, definable on lambda terms, is alpha equivalence. It captures the intuition that the particular choice of a bound variable, in an abstraction, does not (usually) matter.
In many presentations, it is usual to identify alpha-equivalent lambda terms.

The following definitions are necessary in order to be able to define β-reduction:

 Free variables 
The free variables of a term are those variables not bound by an abstraction. The set of free variables of an expression is defined inductively:

For example, the lambda term representing the identity  has no free variables, but the function   has a single free variable, .

 Capture-avoiding substitutions 
A systematic change in variables to avoid capture of a free variable can introduce error, in a functional programming language where functions are first class citizens. 

This is defined so that:
  ; substitution distributes to further application of the variable

The freshness condition (requiring that  is not in the free variables of ) is crucial in order to ensure that substitution does not change the meaning of functions.
For example, a substitution that ignores the freshness condition can lead to errors: . This substitution turns the constant function  into the identity  by substitution.

In general, failure to meet the freshness condition can be remedied by alpha-renaming with a suitable fresh variable.
For example, switching back to our correct notion of substitution, in  the abstraction can be renamed with a fresh variable , to obtain , and the meaning of the function is preserved by substitution.

 β-reduction 
The β-reduction rule states that an application of the form  reduces to the term .
For example, for every , . This demonstrates that  really is the identity.
Similarly, which demonstrates that  is a constant function.

The lambda calculus may be seen as an idealized version of a functional programming language, like Haskell or Standard ML.
Under this view, β-reduction corresponds to a computational step. This step can be repeated by additional β-reductions until there are no more applications left to reduce. In the untyped lambda calculus, as presented here, this reduction process may not terminate.
For instance, consider the term .
Here .
That is, the term reduces to itself in a single β-reduction, and therefore the reduction process will never terminate.

Another aspect of the untyped lambda calculus is that it does not distinguish between different kinds of data.
For instance, it may be desirable to write a function that only operates on numbers. However, in the untyped lambda calculus, there is no way to prevent a function from being applied to truth values, strings, or other non-number objects.

 Formal definition 

 Definition 
Lambda expressions are composed of:
 variables v1, v2, ...;
(dot);
 parentheses.

The set of lambda expressions, can be defined inductively:

 If x is a variable, then 
 If x is a variable and  then 
 If  then 

Instances of rule 2 are known as abstractions and instances of rule 3 are known as applications.Corrections.

 Notation 
To keep the notation of lambda expressions uncluttered, the following conventions are usually applied:
 Outermost parentheses are dropped: M N instead of (M N).
 Applications are assumed to be left associative: M N P may be written instead of ((M N) P).
 When all variables are single-letter, the space in applications may be omitted: MNP instead of M N P.
 The body of an abstraction extends as far right as possible: λx.M N means λx.(M N) and not (λx.M) N.
 A sequence of abstractions is contracted: λx.λy.λz.N is abbreviated as λxyz.N.

 Free and bound variables 
The abstraction operator, λ, is said to bind its variable wherever it occurs in the body of the abstraction. Variables that fall within the scope of an abstraction are said to be bound. In an expression λx.M, the part λx is often called binder, as a hint that the variable x is getting bound by prepending λx to M. All other variables are called free. For example, in the expression λy.x x y, y is a bound variable and x is a free variable. Also a variable is bound by its nearest abstraction. In the following example the single occurrence of x in the expression is bound by the second lambda: λx.y (λx.z x).

The set of free variables of a lambda expression, M, is denoted as FV(M) and is defined by recursion on the structure of the terms, as follows:
 FV(x) = {x}, where x is a variable.
 FV(λx.M) = FV(M) \ {x}.
 

An expression that contains no free variables is said to be closed. Closed lambda expressions are also known as combinators and are equivalent to terms in combinatory logic.

 Reduction 
The meaning of lambda expressions is defined by how expressions can be reduced.

There are three kinds of reduction:
 α-conversion: changing bound variables;
 β-reduction: applying functions to their arguments;
 η-reduction: which captures a notion of extensionality.

We also speak of the resulting equivalences: two expressions are α-equivalent, if they can be α-converted into the same expression. β-equivalence and η-equivalence are defined similarly.

The term redex, short for reducible expression, refers to subterms that can be reduced by one of the reduction rules. For example, (λx.M) N is a β-redex in expressing the substitution of N for x in M. The expression to which a redex reduces is called its reduct; the reduct of (λx.M) N is M[x := N].

If x is not free in M, λx.M x is also an η-redex, with a reduct of M.

 α-conversion 
α-conversion, sometimes known as α-renaming, allows bound variable names to be changed. For example, α-conversion of λx.x might yield λy.y. Terms that differ only by α-conversion are called α-equivalent. Frequently, in uses of lambda calculus, α-equivalent terms are considered to be equivalent.

The precise rules for α-conversion are not completely trivial. First, when α-converting an abstraction, the only variable occurrences that are renamed are those that are bound to the same abstraction. For example, an α-conversion of λx.λx.x could result in λy.λx.x, but it could not result in λy.λx.y. The latter has a different meaning from the original. This is analogous to the programming notion of variable shadowing.

Second, α-conversion is not possible if it would result in a variable getting captured by a different abstraction. For example, if we replace x with y in λx.λy.x, we get λy.λy.y, which is not at all the same.

In programming languages with static scope, α-conversion can be used to make name resolution simpler by ensuring that no variable name masks a name in a containing scope (see α-renaming to make name resolution trivial).

In the De Bruijn index notation, any two α-equivalent terms are syntactically identical.

 Substitution 
Substitution, written M[x := N], is the process of replacing all free occurrences of the variable x in the expression M with expression N. Substitution on terms of the lambda calculus is defined by recursion on the structure of terms, as follows (note: x and y are only variables while M and N are any lambda expression):

 x[x := N] = N
 y[x := N] = y, if x ≠ y
 (M1 M2)[x := N] = M1[x := N] M2[x := N]
 (λx.M)[x := N] = λx.M

To substitute into an abstraction, it is sometimes necessary to α-convert the expression. For example, it is not correct for (λx.y)[y := x] to result in λx.x, because the substituted x was supposed to be free but ended up being bound. The correct substitution in this case is λz.x, up to α-equivalence. Substitution is defined uniquely up to α-equivalence.

 β-reduction 
β-reduction captures the idea of function application. β-reduction is defined in terms of substitution: the β-reduction of (λx.M) N is M[x := N].

For example, assuming some encoding of 2, 7, ×, we have the following β-reduction: (λn.n × 2) 7 → 7 × 2.

β-reduction can be seen to be the same as the concept of local reducibility in natural deduction, via the Curry–Howard isomorphism.

 η-reduction 
η-reduction (eta reduction) expresses the idea of extensionality, which in this context is that two functions are the same if and only if they give the same result for all arguments. η-reduction converts between λx.f x and f whenever x does not appear free in f.

η-reduction can be seen to be the same as the concept of local completeness in natural deduction, via the Curry–Howard isomorphism.

 Normal forms and confluence 

For the untyped lambda calculus, β-reduction as a rewriting rule is neither strongly normalising nor weakly normalising.

However, it can be shown that β-reduction is confluent when working up to α-conversion (i.e. we consider two normal forms to be equal if it is possible to α-convert one into the other).

Therefore, both strongly normalising terms and weakly normalising terms have a unique normal form. For strongly normalising terms, any reduction strategy is guaranteed to yield the normal form, whereas for weakly normalising terms, some reduction strategies may fail to find it.

 Encoding datatypes 

The basic lambda calculus may be used to model booleans, arithmetic, data structures and recursion, as illustrated in the following sub-sections.

 Arithmetic in lambda calculus 
There are several possible ways to define the natural numbers in lambda calculus, but by far the most common are the Church numerals, which can be defined as follows:
 
 
 
 
and so on. Or using the alternative syntax presented above in Notation:

 
 
 
 

A Church numeral is a higher-order function—it takes a single-argument function , and returns another single-argument function. Such repeated compositions (of a single function ) obey the laws of exponents, which is why these numerals can be used for arithmetic. (In Church's original lambda calculus, the formal parameter of a lambda expression was required to occur at least once in the function body, which made the above definition of  impossible.)

One way of thinking about the Church numeral , which is often useful when analysing programs, is as an instruction 'repeat n times'. The lambda term is
 
By varying what is being repeated, and varying what argument that function being repeated is applied to, a great many different effects can be achieved.

 
 
 can be thought of as a function taking two natural numbers as arguments and returning a natural number; it can be verified that
 
and
 
are β-equivalent lambda expressions. Since adding  to a number  can be accomplished by adding 1  times, an alternative definition is:
 
Similarly, multiplication can be defined as
 
Alternatively
 
Exponentiation has a rather simple rendering in Church numerals, namely
 
The formula
 
With the predecessor function, subtraction is straightforward. Defining
 ,
 yields  when  and  otherwise.

 Logic and predicates 
By convention, the following two definitions (known as Church booleans) are used for the boolean values  and :
 
 
Then, with these two lambda terms, we can define some logic operators (these are just possible formulations; other expressions are equally correct):
 
 
 
 
We are now able to compute some logic functions, for example:

 
 
 

A predicate is a function that returns a boolean value.
 
The following predicate tests whether the first argument is less-than-or-equal-to the second:
 ,

For example, the predecessor function can be defined as:
 
which can be verified by showing inductively that  is the add  − 1 function for  > 0.

 Pairs 
For example,  encapsulates the pair,  returns the first element of the pair, and  returns the second.

 
 
 
 
 

The predicate  tests for the value .

As an example of the use of pairs, the shift-and-increment function that maps  to  can be defined as
 
which allows us to give perhaps the most transparent version of the predecessor function:
 

 Additional programming techniques 
There is a considerable body of programming idioms for lambda calculus. Many of these were originally developed in the context of using lambda calculus as a foundation for programming language semantics, effectively using lambda calculus as a low-level programming language. Because several programming languages include the lambda calculus (or something very similar) as a fragment, these techniques also see use in practical programming, but may then be perceived as obscure or foreign.

 Named constants 
In lambda calculus, a library would take the form of a collection of previously defined functions, which as lambda-terms are merely particular constants. The pure lambda calculus does not have a concept of named constants since all atomic lambda-terms are variables, but one can emulate having named constants by setting aside a variable as the name of the constant, using abstraction to bind that variable in the main body, and apply that abstraction to the intended definition. Thus to use  to mean N (some explicit lambda-term) in M (another lambda-term, the "main program"), one can say
 M N
 NM
By chaining such definitions, one can write a lambda calculus "program" as zero or more function definitions, followed by one lambda-term using those functions that constitutes the main body of the program.

The  construction would allow writing recursive function definitions.

 Recursion and fixed points 

Recursion is the definition of a function using the function itself. A definition containing itself inside itself, by value, leads to the whole value being of infinite size. Other notations which support recursion natively overcome this by referring to the function definition by name. Lambda calculus cannot express this: all functions are anonymous in lambda calculus, so we can't refer by name to a value which is yet to be defined, inside the lambda term defining that same value. However, a lambda expression can receive itself as its own argument, for example in  . Here E should be an abstraction, applying its parameter to a value to express recursion.

Consider the factorial function  recursively defined by

 .

In the lambda expression which is to represent this function, a parameter (typically the first one) will be assumed to receive the lambda expression itself as its value, so that calling it – applying it to an argument – will amount to recursion. Thus to achieve recursion, the intended-as-self-referencing argument (called  here) must always be passed to itself within the function body, at a call point:

 
 with    to hold, so    and
 

The self-application achieves replication here, passing the function's lambda expression on to the next invocation as an argument value, making it available to be referenced and called there.

This solves it but requires re-writing each recursive call as self-application. We would like to have a generic solution, without a need for any re-writes:

 
 with    to hold, so    and
   where  
 so that  

Given a lambda term with first argument representing recursive call (e.g.  here), the fixed-point combinator  will return a self-replicating lambda expression representing the recursive function (here). The function does not need to be explicitly passed to itself at any point, for the self-replication is arranged in advance, when it is created, to be done each time it is called. Thus the original lambda expression  is re-created inside itself, at call-point, achieving self-reference.

In fact, there are many possible definitions for this  operator, the simplest of them being:

  

 
 
 
 
 

Now, to perform our recursive call to the factorial function, we would simply call ,  where n is the number we are calculating the factorial of. Given n = 4, for example, this gives:

 
 
 
 
 
 
 
 
 
 
 
 
 
 
 
 
 
 
 

Every recursively defined function can be seen as a fixed point of some suitably defined function closing over the recursive call with an extra argument, and therefore, using , every recursively defined function can be expressed as a lambda expression. In particular, we can now cleanly define the subtraction, multiplication and comparison predicate of natural numbers recursively.

 Standard terms 
Certain terms have commonly accepted names:

  
  
  
  
  
  
  
  

 is the identity function.  and  form complete combinator calculus systems that can express any lambda term - see 

 Abstraction elimination 

If N is a lambda-term without abstraction, but possibly containing named constants (combinators), then there exists a lambda-term T(N) which is equivalent to N but lacks abstraction (except as part of the named constants, if these are considered non-atomic). The conversion function T can be defined by:
 T() := I T(N) := K N if  is not free in N.
 T(M N) := S T(M) T(N)
In either case, a term of the form T(N) P can reduce by having the initial combinator I, K, or S grab the argument P, just like β-reduction of N P would do. I returns that argument. K throws the argument away, just like N would do if  has no free occurrence in N. S passes the argument on to both subterms of the application, and then applies the result of the first to the result of the second.

In comparison to B and C, the S combinator actually conflates two functionalities: rearranging arguments, and duplicating an argument so that it may be used in two places. The W combinator does only the latter, yielding the B, C, K, W system as an alternative to SKI combinator calculus.

 Typed lambda calculus 

A typed lambda calculus is a typed formalism that uses the lambda-symbol to denote anonymous function abstraction. In this context, types are usually objects of a syntactic nature that are assigned to lambda terms; the exact nature of a type depends on the calculus considered (see Kinds of typed lambda calculi). From a certain point of view, typed lambda calculi can be seen as refinements of the untyped lambda calculus but from another point of view, they can also be considered the more fundamental theory and untyped lambda calculus a special case with only one type.

Typed lambda calculi are foundational programming languages and are the base of typed functional programming languages such as ML and Haskell and, more indirectly, typed imperative programming languages. Typed lambda calculi play an important role in the design of type systems for programming languages; here typability usually captures desirable properties of the program, e.g. the program will not cause a memory access violation.

Typed lambda calculi are closely related to mathematical logic and proof theory via the Curry–Howard isomorphism and they can be considered as the internal language of classes of categories, e.g. the simply typed lambda calculus is the language of Cartesian closed categories (CCCs).

 Reduction strategies 

Whether a term is normalising or not, and how much work needs to be done in normalising it if it is, depends to a large extent on the reduction strategy used. Common lambda calculus reduction strategies include:
 Normal order The leftmost, outermost redex is always reduced first. That is, whenever possible the arguments are substituted into the body of an abstraction before the arguments are reduced.
 Applicative order The leftmost, innermost redex is always reduced first. Intuitively this means a function's arguments are always reduced before the function itself. Applicative order always attempts to apply functions to normal forms, even when this is not possible.
 Full β-reductions Any redex can be reduced at any time. This means essentially the lack of any particular reduction strategy—with regard to reducibility, "all bets are off".

Weak reduction strategies do not reduce under lambda abstractions:
 Call by value A redex is reduced only when its right hand side has reduced to a value (variable or abstraction). Only the outermost redexes are reduced.
 Call by name As normal order, but no reductions are performed inside abstractions. For example,  is in normal form according to this strategy, although it contains the redex .

Strategies with sharing reduce computations that are "the same" in parallel:
 Optimal reduction As normal order, but computations that have the same label are reduced simultaneously.
 Call by need As call by name (hence weak), but function applications that would duplicate terms instead name the argument, which is then reduced only "when it is needed".

 Computability 
There is no algorithm that takes as input any two lambda expressions and outputs  or  depending on whether one expression reduces to the other. More precisely, no computable function can decide the question. This was historically the first problem for which undecidability could be proven. As usual for such a proof, computable means computable by any model of computation that is Turing complete. See the Church–Turing thesis for other approaches to defining computability and their equivalence.

Church's proof of uncomputability first reduces the problem to determining whether a given lambda expression has a normal form. Then he assumes that this predicate is computable, and can hence be expressed in lambda calculus. Building on earlier work by Kleene and constructing a Gödel numbering for lambda expressions, he constructs a lambda expression  that closely follows the proof of Gödel's first incompleteness theorem. If  is applied to its own Gödel number, a contradiction results.

 Complexity 

The notion of computational complexity for the lambda calculus is a bit tricky, because the cost of a β-reduction may vary depending on how it is implemented. 
To be precise, one must somehow find the location of all of the occurrences of the bound variable  in the expression , implying a time cost, or one must keep track of the locations of free variables in some way, implying a space cost. Director strings were an early approach that traded this time cost for a quadratic space usage. More generally this has led to the study of systems that use explicit substitution.

In 2014 it was shown that the number of β-reduction steps taken by normal order reduction to reduce a term is a reasonable time cost model, that is, the reduction can be simulated on a Turing machine in time polynomially proportional to the number of steps. This was a long-standing open problem, due to size explosion, the existence of lambda terms which grow exponentially in size for each β-reduction. The result gets around this by working with a compact shared representation. The result makes clear that the amount of space needed to evaluate a lambda term is not proportional to the size of the term during reduction. It is not currently known what a good measure of space complexity would be.

An unreasonable model does not necessarily mean inefficient. Optimal reduction reduces all computations with the same label in one step, avoiding duplicated work, but the number of parallel β-reduction steps to reduce a given term to normal form is approximately linear in the size of the term. This is far too small to be a reasonable cost measure, as any Turing machine may be encoded in the lambda calculus in size linearly proportional to the size of the Turing machine. The true cost of reducing lambda terms is not due to β-reduction per se but rather the handling of the duplication of redexes during β-reduction. It is not known if optimal reduction implementations are reasonable when measured with respect to a reasonable cost model such as the number of leftmost-outermost steps to normal form, but it has been shown for fragments of the lambda calculus that the optimal reduction algorithm is efficient and has at most a quadratic overhead compared to leftmost-outermost. In addition the BOHM prototype implementation of optimal reduction outperformed both Caml Light and Haskell on pure lambda terms.

 Lambda calculus and programming languages 
As pointed out by Peter Landin's 1965 paper "A Correspondence between ALGOL 60 and Church's Lambda-notation", sequential procedural programming languages can be understood in terms of the lambda calculus, which provides the basic mechanisms for procedural abstraction and procedure (subprogram) application.

 Anonymous functions 

For example, in Python the "square" function can be expressed as a lambda expression as follows:

(lambda x: x**2)

The above example is an expression that evaluates to a first-class function. The symbol lambda creates an anonymous function, given a list of parameter names, x – just a single argument in this case, and an expression that is evaluated as the body of the function, x**2. Anonymous functions are sometimes called lambda expressions.

For example, Pascal and many other imperative languages have long supported passing subprograms as arguments to other subprograms through the mechanism of function pointers. However, function pointers are not a sufficient condition for functions to be first class datatypes, because a function is a first class datatype if and only if new instances of the function can be created at run-time. And this run-time creation of functions is supported in Smalltalk, JavaScript and Wolfram Language, and more recently in Scala, Eiffel ("agents"), C# ("delegates") and C++11, among others.

 Parallelism and concurrency 
The Church–Rosser property of the lambda calculus means that evaluation (β-reduction) can be carried out in any order, even in parallel. This means that various nondeterministic evaluation strategies are relevant. However, the lambda calculus does not offer any explicit constructs for parallelism. One can add constructs such as Futures to the lambda calculus. Other process calculi have been developed for describing communication and concurrency.

 Semantics 
The fact that lambda calculus terms act as functions on other lambda calculus terms, and even on themselves, led to questions about the semantics of the lambda calculus. Could a sensible meaning be assigned to lambda calculus terms? The natural semantics was to find a set D isomorphic to the function space D → D, of functions on itself. However, no nontrivial such D can exist, by cardinality constraints because the set of all functions from D to D has greater cardinality than D, unless D is a singleton set.

In the 1970s, Dana Scott showed that if only continuous functions were considered, a set or domain D with the required property could be found, thus providing a model for the lambda calculus.

This work also formed the basis for the denotational semantics of programming languages.

 Variations and extensions 
These extensions are in the lambda cube:
 Typed lambda calculus – Lambda calculus with typed variables (and functions)
 System F – A typed lambda calculus with type-variables
 Calculus of constructions – A typed lambda calculus with types as first-class values

These formal systems are extensions of lambda calculus that are not in the lambda cube:
 Binary lambda calculus – A version of lambda calculus with binary I/O, a binary encoding of terms, and a designated universal machine.
 Lambda-mu calculus – An extension of the lambda calculus for treating classical logic

These formal systems are variations of lambda calculus:
 Kappa calculus – A first-order analogue of lambda calculus

These formal systems are related to lambda calculus:
 Combinatory logic – A notation for mathematical logic without variables
 SKI combinator calculus – A computational system based on the S, K and I''' combinators, equivalent to lambda calculus, but reducible without variable substitutions

 See also 

 Applicative computing systems – Treatment of objects in the style of the lambda calculus
 Cartesian closed category – A setting for lambda calculus in category theory
 Categorical abstract machine – A model of computation applicable to lambda calculus
 Curry–Howard isomorphism – The formal correspondence between programs and proofs
 De Bruijn index – notation disambiguating alpha conversions
 De Bruijn notation – notation using postfix modification functions
 Deductive lambda calculus – The consideration of the problems associated with considering lambda calculus as a Deductive system.
 Domain theory – Study of certain posets giving denotational semantics for lambda calculus
 Evaluation strategy – Rules for the evaluation of expressions in programming languages
 Explicit substitution – The theory of substitution, as used in β-reduction
 Functional programming
 Harrop formula – A kind of constructive logical formula such that proofs are lambda terms
 Interaction nets
 Kleene–Rosser paradox – A demonstration that some form of lambda calculus is inconsistent
 Knights of the Lambda Calculus – A semi-fictional organization of LISP and Scheme hackers
 Krivine machine – An abstract machine to interpret call-by-name in lambda calculus
 Lambda calculus definition – Formal definition of the lambda calculus.
 Let expression – An expression closely related to an abstraction.
 Minimalism (computing)
 Rewriting – Transformation of formulæ in formal systems
 SECD machine – A virtual machine designed for the lambda calculus
 Scott–Curry theorem – A theorem about sets of lambda terms
 To Mock a Mockingbird – An introduction to combinatory logic
 Universal Turing machine – A formal computing machine that is equivalent to lambda calculus
 Unlambda – An esoteric functional programming language based on combinatory logic

 Further reading 
 Abelson, Harold & Gerald Jay Sussman. Structure and Interpretation of Computer Programs. The MIT Press. .
 Hendrik Pieter Barendregt Introduction to Lambda Calculus.
 Henk Barendregt, The Impact of the Lambda Calculus in Logic and Computer Science. The Bulletin of Symbolic Logic, Volume 3, Number 2, June 1997.
 Barendregt, Hendrik Pieter, The Type Free Lambda Calculus pp1091–1132 of Handbook of Mathematical Logic, North-Holland (1977) 
 Cardone and Hindley, 2006. History of Lambda-calculus and Combinatory Logic. In Gabbay and Woods (eds.), Handbook of the History of Logic, vol. 5. Elsevier.
 Church, Alonzo, An unsolvable problem of elementary number theory, American Journal of Mathematics, 58 (1936), pp. 345–363. This paper contains the proof that the equivalence of lambda expressions is in general not decidable.
 
 
 Kleene, Stephen, A theory of positive integers in formal logic, American Journal of Mathematics, 57 (1935), pp. 153–173 and 219–244. Contains the lambda calculus definitions of several familiar functions.
 Landin, Peter, A Correspondence Between ALGOL 60 and Church's Lambda-Notation, Communications of the ACM, vol. 8, no. 2 (1965), pages 89–101. Available from the ACM site. A classic paper highlighting the importance of lambda calculus as a basis for programming languages.
 Larson, Jim, An Introduction to Lambda Calculus and Scheme. A gentle introduction for programmers.

 Schalk, A. and Simmons, H. (2005) An introduction to λ-calculi and arithmetic with a decent selection of exercises. Notes for a course in the Mathematical Logic MSc at Manchester University.
  A paper giving a formal underpinning to the idea of 'meaning-is-use' which, even if based on proofs, it is different from proof-theoretic semantics as in the Dummett–Prawitz tradition since it takes reduction as the rules giving meaning.
 Hankin, Chris, An Introduction to Lambda Calculi for Computer Scientists, 

Monographs/textbooks for graduate students
 Morten Heine Sørensen, Paweł Urzyczyn, Lectures on the Curry–Howard isomorphism, Elsevier, 2006,  is a recent monograph that covers the main topics of lambda calculus from the type-free variety, to most typed lambda calculi, including more recent developments like pure type systems and the lambda cube. It does not cover subtyping extensions.
  covers lambda calculi from a practical type system perspective; some topics like dependent types are only mentioned, but subtyping is an important topic.

Documents
 Achim Jung, A Short Introduction to the Lambda Calculus-(PDF)
 Dana Scott, A timeline of lambda calculus-(PDF)
 Raúl Rojas, A Tutorial Introduction to the Lambda Calculus-(PDF)
 Peter Selinger, Lecture Notes on the Lambda Calculus-(PDF)
 Marius Buliga, Graphic lambda calculus
 Lambda Calculus as a Workflow Model by Peter Kelly, Paul Coddington, and Andrew Wendelborn; mentions graph reduction as a common means of evaluating lambda expressions and discusses the applicability of lambda calculus for distributed computing (due to the Church–Rosser property, which enables parallel graph reduction for lambda expressions).

Notes

References 
Some parts of this article are based on material from FOLDOC, used with permission.

External links

 Graham Hutton, Lambda Calculus, a short (12 minutes) Computerphile video on the Lambda Calculus
 Helmut Brandl, Step by Step Introduction to Lambda Calculus
 
 David C. Keenan, To Dissect a Mockingbird: A Graphical Notation for the Lambda Calculus with Animated Reduction
 L. Allison, Some executable λ-calculus examples
 Georg P. Loczewski, The Lambda Calculus and A++
 Bret Victor, Alligator Eggs: A Puzzle Game Based on Lambda Calculus
 Lambda Calculus  on Safalra's Website 
 LCI Lambda Interpreter a simple yet powerful pure calculus interpreter
 Lambda Calculus links on Lambda-the-Ultimate
 Mike Thyer, Lambda Animator, a graphical Java applet demonstrating alternative reduction strategies.
 Implementing the Lambda calculus using C++ Templates
 Shane Steinert-Threlkeld, "Lambda Calculi", Internet Encyclopedia of Philosophy
 Anton Salikhmetov, Macro Lambda Calculus

 
1936 in computing
Articles with example Lisp (programming language) code
Computability theory
Formal methods
Models of computation
Theoretical computer science